The 2010–11 Montreal Stars season  is the fourth in the history of the franchise. The Stars compete in the Canadian Women's Hockey League and will attempt to win its second Clarkson Cup in franchise history.

Offseason
September 11: The  Centre Etienne Desmarteau  in Montreal, Québec, named one of the rinks in the arena in Caroline Ouellette's honour.

News and notes
November 20–21: Montreal swept Brampton in a 2-game series. The battle between the top two teams in the Canadian Women's Hockey League resulted in Montreal remaining undefeated. The November 20 game involved a pre-game salute. Montreal recognized Angela James, the Head Coach of Brampton for her historic induction into the Hockey Hall of Fame, and held a minute of silence for the passing of Pat Burns at the Étienne Desmarteau Arena.
December 19: The Blades came from behind to defeat Montreal. In doing so, they broke up Montreal's bid for an undefeated season.  Boston goalie Mandy Cronin stopped 74 shots to lead Boston to victory. Montreal had an early 2–0 lead. In the 2nd period, Blades player Sam Faber scored on an assist by Jess Koizumi. In the third period, Koizumi would tie the game. With 3:24 to play in the game, Angela Ruggiero scored the game-winning goal. She was assisted by Sam Faber and Haley Moore.
Mélodie Daoust was called up as an emergency fill-in with the Montreal Stars. The nineteen-year-old scored three points in her CWHL debut on January 8 (versus the Burlington Barracudas).
January 18, 2011: The Brampton Thunder competed against the Montreal Stars at the Invista Centre in Kingston, Ontario. This is team captain Jayna Hefford's hometown and she scored a goal in front of her closest friends, family and fans. In addition, her number 15 was raised to the rafters of the Invista Centre on behalf of the Kingston Area Minor Hockey Association. As of 2012, no sweaters bearing Hefford's number will be used in Kingston Minor Hockey.
January 25: Lisa-Marie Breton-Lebreux was named to the CWHL Board of Directors for 2011.

January 29: Montreal raised awareness and funds for the Fondation du cancer du sein du Québec (FCSQ). The game featured the Montreal club in pink at Centre Etienne Desmarteau versus the Boston Blades. Montreal prevailed by a 3–0 score (goals scored by: Stephanie Denino, Sarah Vaillancourt and Tawnya Davis). 800 persons came to support the cause: A record of attendance for a match of Montreal Stars at Montreal. 5000 $ were amassed for the Foundation of the breast cancer during this match.
February 5, 6, 12 and 13: Montreal Stars played a series of home games at the Centre multisports de Châteauguay (arena Léo-Crépin), hometown of Kim St-Pierre.

February 26 & 27: Montreal Stars finished their regular season with two exciting wins against Boston this weekend, solidifying their fifth consecutive victory and the top spot in the league. The final score Saturday was 5–4, and Sunday, 4–1 
March 11, 12 & 13: Montreal Stars will host the first playoff round of the season in Montreal on March 11, 12 and 13. The locations for the games are Friday March 11, 4:30 PM at Ed Meagher Arena (Concordia University), Saturday March 12, 6:00 PM at McConnell Arena (McGill University), and Sunday March 13 1:30 PM at Leo Crepin Arena, Châteauguay (near Montreal).
Saturday 12 March, Montreal Stars are celebrating Fan Appreciation Night! The team will be thanking  fans for an awesome season with free souvenir programs, cool prizes to win, and an autograph session with players, after the game!

Regular season

Schedule

Standings
Note: GP = Games played, W = Wins, L = Losses, T = Ties, OTL = Overtime losses, GF = Goals for, GA = Goals against, Pts = Points.

Notables players 2010–11

 Kim St-Pierre  – Best goalie in the CWHL
 Caroline Ouellette  – First Leading scorer in the CWHL
 Noemie Marin  – 4th leading scorer in the CWHL
 Emmanuelle Blais  – 5th leading scorer in the CWHL
 Julie Chu    – 5th leading scorer in the CWHL
 Annie Guay    – 7th leading scorer and only Defencemen in the top 10 scoring leaders
 Sarah Vaillancourt   – 9th leading scorer in the CWHL

Postseason
Montreal wins the playoff against Brampton and wins the CWHL Championship. Montreal ends the season on a high! Taking inspiration from their two spectaculars wins, the team  participate in Clarkson Cup Championship.

Clarkson cup

This year, the Clarkson Cup Championship include three teams from the Canadian Women's Hockey League and the champion team of the Western Women's Hockey League.

Montreal first game: The Stars wins 5 to 1 against Minnesota Whitecaps. In the second game, Sarah Vaillancourt scored 3 goals  to lead Montreal to a 7–4 victory over Brampton. Saturday, the third day of the tournament, Montreal Stars scored a crucial victory 2–1 against Toronto. This win guarantees Montreal a place in the Clarkson Cup final, on Sunday against Toronto, who also recorded two victories in the tournament.

Championship game 
March 27 Sunday: The final Game concluded with the powerful Montreal team defeating Toronto  5 -0. Montreal got off to a  2 – 0 lead in the first period, The first goal was scored by Noémie Marin on a backhand from her off wing  at 14:47 minute as she converted a pass from Caroline Ouellette. The second goal was scored at 7:29 minute from a face off in the Toronto end as Dominique Thibault took the draw and Vanessa Davidson skated off the boards, picked up the puck and put a quick shot behind goaltender Sami Jo Small. The lone goal of the second period was scored at 10:36 by Sabrina Harbec  on a nice outside drive cutting by Annie Guay. Sabrina Harbec pulled the goalie across the crease and put the puck in the top corner. The shots at the end of the second period were 34 to 17 in favour of Montreal Stars.

Montreal added two more goals in the third period to capture the 5–0 win Final game. At the 5:33 minute, Julie Chu feathered a  pass to Caroline Ouellette. Ouellette making a perfect low shot to score. The final goal of the game was scored with 2:42 left as Sarah Vaillancourt picked up a pass from  Caroline Ouellette  and she hit the mark on a quick shot from about five feet out. Toronto goalie Sami Jo Small played well in defeat  as Montreal controlled the game outshooting Toronto 51 to 26. Toronto did threaten offensively early in the game and could have turned the contest around but Montreal goalie, Kim St-Pierre,  came up with exceptional saves  to earn the shutout and ultimately crown Montreal Stars  the Clarkson Cup Champions 2011.

Hockey Canada Selection Camp
Five Montreal Stars players invited: Caroline Ouellette, Kim St-Pierre, Sarah Vaillancourt, Emmanuelle Blais and Noemie Marin have been invited to Canada's National Team selection camp. The chosen players will represent women's national team  at the 2011 World Women's Championships held in Switzerland, on April 16–25, 2011. The Hockey Canada selection camp, which takes place from April 2 to 5 at the Toronto MasterCard Centre.

See also
 2010–11 CWHL season
 Montreal Stars
 Canadian Women's Hockey League
 2011 Clarkson Cup

References

External news story
 Trying to get the message out by Stephanie Myles, The Gazette, March 24, 2011.
 Montreal beats Toronto to win the Clarkson Cup in official blog of Montreal Stars, March 27, 2011.
   Montreal hopes Clarkson Cup win promotes women's hockey league in Globe and Mail, March 27, 2011.

Montreal
Les Canadiennes de Montreal
Mon